Wilory Farm is the 1998 album by Terri Hendrix.

Band Information
 Terri Hendrix - acoustic guitar and vocals
 Ric Ramirez - upright and electric bass, backing vocals
 John Inmon - acoustic, sitar and electric guitar
 Ron Welch - acoustic guitar
 Lloyd Maines - acoustic, steel and electric guitar, mandolin, dobro, banjo and backing vocals
 Paul Pearcy - drums, percussion
 Mark Patterson - drums on "Hole in My Pocket"
 Mark "Suitcase" Stedman - harmonica
 Gene Elders - fiddle
 Riley Osbourn - keyboards, organ, piano
 Joel Guzman - accordion on "Lluvia de Estrellas"
 Ponty Bone - accordion
 Bukka Allen - accordion on "Hole in My Pocket"
 Stan Smith - clarinet
 Freddy Mendoza - trombone
 Pat Murray - trumpet

Producer: Lloyd Maines

Album Tidbits
From her official site: 
Terri named her second album after a special place in Stonewall, Texas called Wilory Farm which was owned by her longtime friend and mentor Marion Williamson who died in the Spring of 1997 due to cancer. Terri took care of the animals on the farm and did book keeping. In return, Marion gave Terri extensive music and guitar lessons. Marion was a very talented musician and composer who taught Terri not only about music, but also about spirituality and strength of character. Throughout her lifetime Marion anonymously funded several music grants and programs for musical instruction and equipment in the Texas hill country area. Terri's time on Wilory Farm and her friendship with Marion helped inspire this record. This album was recorded at Fire Station studios in San Marcos, Tx. It was produced by Lloyd Maines and engineered in part by Bobby Arnold and Fred Remmert. Released June, 1998.

Track listing
 Flowers
 Walk on Me
 Wallet
 Sister’s Apartment
 Love Like This
 Hole In My Pocket
 Gravity
 The Know How
 LLuvia de Estrellas
 Albert The Perfect Friend
 Wind Me Up
 The Last Song
 “Sister’s Song”-Bonus Track

2003 albums
Terri Hendrix albums